The 1975 Houston Cougars football team, also known as the Houston Cougars, Houston, or UH, represented the University of Houston in the 1975 NCAA Division I football season.  It was the 28th year of season play for Houston.  The team was coached by 12th-year head coach Bill Yeoman who was inducted into the College Football Hall of Fame in 2001.  The team played its home games in the Astrodome, a 50,000-person capacity stadium off-campus in Houston at the Astrodomain.  Houston competed as a member of the NCAA in the University Division, independent of any athletic conference.  It was their fourteenth year of doing so.  The Cougars had been admitted to the Southwest Conference two years prior, but were ineligible for conference play until the 1976 season.

Schedule

Coaching staff

References

Houston
Houston Cougars football seasons
Houston Cougars football